John Gordon Harvey Corrigan MBE, FRAS (born 1942) is a former British soldier and historical writer and broadcaster.

Corrigan was educated at the Royal School, Armagh, and the Royal Military Academy Sandhurst. He served in the British Army's Royal Gurkha Rifles, mainly in the far east, and reached the rank of major. Between 1980 and 1987 he took a break from military service, joining the  Royal Hong Kong Jockey Club where he was clerk of the course at the Happy Valley Racecourse from 1980 to 1982, and Racing Secretary from 1982 to 1987. Corrigan was awarded the MBE in 1995 His last appointment was commanding the Gurkha Centre in Hampshire.

Following his retirement from the army in 1998, Corrigan became a freelance writer on military history. He also presented television documentaries, made speaking appearances and conducted tours of World War I battlefields. He is an honorary research fellow of the University of Kent, and the University of Birmingham, and a teaching fellow at the Joint Services Command and Staff College. He is also a fellow of the Royal Asiatic Society, a member of the British Commission for Military History and a liveryman of the Worshipful Company of Farriers.

Corrigan authored  Mud, Blood and Poppycock, one of the more recent histories of the First World War which challenges a number of popular cultural beliefs about that conflict.  Among the targets for his book are the beliefs that British generalship was incompetent, blinkered and reactionary and that the military justice system was unfair. The book received a positive review from historian Gary Sheffield. Corrigan later wrote Blood, Sweat and Arrogance: The Myths of Churchill's War in which he set out to demolish the "myths of Churchill's War". This book was criticised in a review by historian Piers Brendon, who wrote:
"his tone, occasionally sneering, often patronising and always cocksure, is particularly tiresome in someone so prone to error. He makes the elementary mistake of asserting, for example, that a Russian declaration of war against Japan "never came".

His 2010 The Second World War: A Military History received critical acclaim. "[A] highly readable new look at the titanic struggle between nations" - The Independent. "An invaluable source of reference [that] should be savoured" - Daily Express. "Bold, incisive, and insightful....A first class read" - Michael Jones, author of 'The Retreat: Hitler's First Defeat'

His newest work is about the Hundred Years' War.

Published works
A Great and Glorious Adventure: A History of the Hundred Years War and the Birth of Renaissance England, 2014
The Second World War: A Military History, 2010
Mud, Blood and Poppycock, 2003
Blood, Sweat and Arrogance: The Myths of Churchill's War, 2006
Loos 1915: The Unwanted Battle
Sepoys in the Trenches – The Indian Corps on the Western Front 1914–15 (article)
Wellington – a Military Life
Waterloo – A new history of the battle and its armies

References

1942 births
Living people
People educated at The Royal School, Armagh
Historians of World War I
Royal Gurkha Rifles officers
Members of the Order of the British Empire
British military writers
British military historians
Graduates of the Royal Military Academy Sandhurst
Fellows of the Royal Asiatic Society
British Army officers